Oryctini is a tribe of beetles in the Dynastinae (family Scarabaeidae).

This tribe perhaps best describes the term "rhinoceros beetles" and includes important pest species in the type genus Oryctes.  However, the name may also be applied to genera in the Phileurini and related tribes.

Genera
The following are included by BioLib:
 Anomacaulus Fairmaire, 1878
 Blabephorus Fairmaire, 1898
 Calypsoryctes Howden, 1970
 Ceratoryctoderus Arrow, 1908
 Coelosis Hope, 1837
 Clyster Arrow, 1908
 Cyphonistes Burmeister, 1847
 Dichodontus Burmeister, 1847
 Dinoryctes Felsche, 1906
 Enema Hope, 1837
 Gibboryctes Endrödi, 1974
 Heterogomphus Burmeister, 1847
 Hispanioryctes Howden & Endrödy-Younga, 1978
 Hoploryctoderus Prell, 1933
 Irazua Ratcliffe, 2003
 Licnostrategus Prell, 1933
 Megaceras Hope, 1837
 Megaceropsis Dechambre, 1976
 Oryctes Hellwig, 1798
 Podischnus Burmeister, 1847
 Scapanes Burmeister, 1847
 Strategus Kirby, 1828
 Talautoclyster Yamaya, 2001
 Tehuacania Endrödi, 1975
 Trichogomphus Burmeister, 1847
 Xenodorus Brême, 1844
 Xyloryctes Hope, 1837

References

External links

Beetle tribes
Dynastinae